is a Japanese manga artist. She is the illustrator for best selling manga series, Bamboo Blade.

Bibliography 
  (2004, Square Enix); (2009, Yen Press)
  (2011, Square Enix)

References

External links 
Website 

1975 births
Manga artists
Living people